Milan Nenadić (born 12 August 1943) is a retired Serbian middleweight Greco-Roman wrestler. Representing Yugoslavia, Nenadić competed in the 1968 and 1972 Summer Olympics and won a bronze medal in 1972. He was a European champion in 1969 and 1970 and won three medals at the world championships in 1969–1973.

Being of Croatian Serb descent, he is a recipient of the silver plaque of the Serbian Wrestling Association.

References

External links
 

1943 births
Living people
Serbian male sport wrestlers
Croatian male sport wrestlers
Olympic wrestlers of Yugoslavia
Wrestlers at the 1968 Summer Olympics
Wrestlers at the 1972 Summer Olympics
Yugoslav male sport wrestlers
Olympic bronze medalists for Yugoslavia
Olympic medalists in wrestling
Serbs of Croatia
World Wrestling Championships medalists
Medalists at the 1972 Summer Olympics
Mediterranean Games silver medalists for Yugoslavia
Competitors at the 1971 Mediterranean Games
Mediterranean Games medalists in wrestling
European Wrestling Championships medalists